Adem Sarı (born 9 May 1985) is a Turkish footballer who currently plays for TFF Second League club Sivas Belediye Spor. In December 2009 he scored 2 goals in his team Eskişehirspor's 2–1 win over Fenerbahce, taking his tally to 10 goals in 23 games, in all competitions.

People in Indonesia make jokes about his name as his name is similar with one of famous brand in Indonesia, Adem Sari, a drink to relieve sore throat.  Indonesian people even asked him whether he has Indonesian descendant or not but he told that both of his parents are Turkish

References

1985 births
Living people
German people of Turkish descent
Turkish footballers
Eskişehirspor footballers
Denizlispor footballers
Şanlıurfaspor footballers
Altay S.K. footballers
Süper Lig players
SC Pfullendorf players
Association football forwards
People from Villingen-Schwenningen
Sportspeople from Freiburg (region)